Yeshiva Toras Chaim (YTC) is an all-male, Lithuanian (Litvish)-style Talmudic academy in the West Colfax neighborhood of Denver, Colorado. YTC was founded in Denver in 1967.  It is headed by the Roshei Yeshiva, Rav Yisroel Meir Kagan, and Rav Yitzchok Wasserman, both students of Rabbi Aharon Kotler, founder and Rosh Yeshiva of Beth Medrash Govoha in Lakewood, New Jersey.

The student body is multi-state, including pupils from the East Coast.

History
In 1966, a group of community leaders headed by Mr. Sheldon K. Beren approached Beth Medrash Govoha'''s Dov Lesser to discuss potential leadership for the yeshiva.  Lesser mentioned the prospect to Rabbi Yitzchok Wasserman, who was teaching in a bais medrash in Boston at the time. Though Rabbi Wasserman was initially hesitant to leave his Boston position, Mr. Beren convinced him, along with fellow Beth Medrash Govoha talmid Rabbi Chaim Kahn, to come to Denver.  When Rabbis Wasserman and Kahn realized how much time and energy went into recruiting and fundraising, they felt that the importance of having a full-time presence in the bais medrash was crucial enough to warrant the inclusion of another yeshiva head.  Rabbi Wasserman's childhood friend, Rabbi Yisroel Meir Kagan, who was giving chaburas in BMG, was recruited for the job.  The yeshiva opened its doors to students in the fall of 1967.

Due to the yeshiva's unique location (at the time of its founding, YTC was one of the rare full-time yeshivas not located on the east coast, described by a local newspaper as  "the only yeshiva between Chicago and the West Coast") the students were initially mainly from Denver and other western cities.  Seattle, Los Angeles, Detroit, Chicago, Dallas, St. Louis, Vancouver, British Columbia and several other cities were represented, along with bochurim from New York City, New Jersey, Baltimore and other east coast communities.

Academics
The yeshiva provides a full high school program (grades 9–12), a bais-medrash undergraduate program for post-high school bochurim or students, and a chabura or religious study group for married men (kollel yungeleit).  Students lodge in the yeshiva's dormitory facilities, connected to the main yeshiva building.

Refusal of federal funds
The yeshiva is one of less than fifty private schools in the US that offer college-level education—out of a total of more than 2600—that refuse to accept federal funds (so-called Title IV financial aid, from the Higher Education Act of 1965). Most if not all other such schools are conservative Christian colleges. By rejecting federal funding, which includes financial aid for students, the yeshiva is not required to adhere to federal guidelines other universities do, including guidelines related to discrimination, investigations of accusations of sexual abuse, and the reporting of on-campus crimes.

In particular, "can get exemptions if they can show they are controlled by religious organizations with whose beliefs Title IX requirements conflict."

Community outreach
 
YTC is responsible for spearheading many of the successful Community Outreach (kiruv) programs in Denver.  Yeshiva staff members were giving informal classes in homes on Denver's East Side before 1983, when YTC responded to the needs of the community by becoming the first yeshiva in the United States to employ a full-time kiruv professional.  In 1986, Rabbi and Mrs. Wasserman traveled to Santa Fe, New Mexico, where they taught Torah and spent Shabbos in an effort to raise Jewish awareness in the Southwest.

Today, Rabbi Yaakov Meyer, the yeshiva's original outreach director, leads a flourishing Aish HaTorah community in Southeast Denver.  Rabbi Aaron Y. Wasserman, son of Rabbi Yitzchok Wasserman, heads The Jewish Experience, a multifaceted outreach project in Denver which provides classes, a Sunday school, Shabbatonim in the Rocky Mountains, and many other programs that appeal to a wide variety of Jews.

Yeshivah Toras Chaim also has an active “inreach” program.  Merkaz Torah V'Chesed, located in East Denver, serves as a nightly beis medrash open to the community.  Merkaz provides a high-level shiur given by its rabbinical director, Rabbi Aver Jacobs, along with chavrusa learning, regular classes and other events organized by program director Rabbi Chaim Sher, an alumnus of Beth Medrash Govoha.  Merkaz's regular programming includes women's classes, youth programming, Rabbi Yissocher Frand's weekly parsha shiur (via the Torah Conferencing Network) and annual teshuva drasha, Chol Hamoed sedarim, and an annual Chanukah chagiga''.

References

External links
 Official website

1967 establishments in Colorado
Educational institutions established in 1967
Haredi Judaism in the United States
Haredi yeshivas
Jewish education in the United States
Jews and Judaism in Denver
Lithuanian-Jewish culture in the United States
Mesivtas
Orthodox yeshivas in the United States